The Roman Catholic Diocese of Krishnagar is a diocese located in the city of Krishnagar in the Ecclesiastical province of Calcutta in India.

History
 1855: Established as Missio Sui Iuris of Central Bengal from the Apostolic Vicariate of Western Bengal
 1870: Promoted as Apostolic Prefecture of Central Bengal
 1 September 1886: Promoted as Diocese of Central Bengal
 1887: Renamed as Diocese of Krishnagar

Leadership
Superiors
 Fr. Albino Parietti, P.I.M.E. (1855 - 30 November 1864)
 Fr. Luigi Limana, P.I.M.E. (1864 - 17 March 1870)
Apostolic prefects
 Fr. Antonio Marietti, P.I.M.E. (August 1870 - 1878)
 Fr. Francesco Pozzi, P.I.M.E. (April 1879 - 25 November 1886)
 Bishops of Krishnagar
 Bishop Francesco Pozzi, P.I.M.E. (25 November 1886 – 22 October 1905)
 Bishop Santino Taveggia, P.I.M.E. (23 August 1906 – 1927)
 Bishop Stephen Ferrando, S.D.B. (later Archbishop) (9 July 1934 – 26 November 1935)
 Bishop Louis La Ravoire Morrow, S.D.B. (25 May 1939 – 31 October 1969)
 Bishop Matthew Baroi, S.D.B. (17 September 1973 – 4 April 1983)
 Apostolic Administrator 1970 – 17 September 1973
 Bishop Lucas Sirkar (later Archbishop) (22 June 1984 – 14 April 2000)
 Bishop Joseph Suren Gomes, S.D.B. (17 April 2002 – 17 April 2019)

Saints and causes for canonisation
 Ven. Francesco Convertini

References

External links
 GCatholic.org 
 Catholic Hierarchy 

Roman Catholic dioceses in India
Religious organizations established in 1870
Roman Catholic dioceses and prelatures established in the 19th century
Christianity in West Bengal
1870 establishments in India
Nadia district
Krishnanagar